Mae Tha may refer to:
 Mae Tha District, Lampang
 Mae Tha District, Lamphun
 Mae Tha Subdistrict, Chiang Mai